Ivan "Ivo" Šuprina (1 October 1921 – 13 July 1988</ref>Il Mattino, 14 July 1988</ref>) was a Croatian international footballer who professionally throughout Europe as a striker during the 1940s.

Career
Born in Zagreb, Šuprina began his career in his native Croatia for hometown clubs Građanski Zagreb and Dinamo Zagreb. He later played in France for Lyon and Strasbourg; during his time in France he was known as Yvon Šuprina'. Šuprina also played in Italy for Napoli.

International career
Šuprina made his debut for the Banovina of Croatia in an April 1940 friendly match against Switzerland and earned a total of 4 caps, scoring no goals. He played the last one of these games under the flag of the Independent State of Croatia, a World War II-era puppet state of Nazi Germany.

References

External links
 

1921 births
1988 deaths
Association football forwards
Yugoslav footballers
Croatian footballers
Croatia international footballers
HŠK Građanski Zagreb players
GNK Dinamo Zagreb players
Olympique Lyonnais players
RC Strasbourg Alsace players
S.S.C. Napoli players
Ligue 1 players
Serie A players
Serie B players
Yugoslav expatriate footballers
Expatriate footballers in Italy
Yugoslav expatriate sportspeople in Italy
Expatriate footballers in France
Yugoslav expatriate sportspeople in France